Ținutul Prut was one of the ten Romanian ținuturi ("lands"), founded in 1938 after King Carol II initiated an institutional reform by modifying the 1923 Constitution and the law of territorial administration. It comprised parts of central Moldavia (and central Bessarabia), and was named after the Prut River; its capital was the city of Iași. Ținutul Prut ceased to exist following the territorial losses of Romania to the Soviet Union and the king's abdication in 1940.

Coat of arms
The coat of arms is party per cross in nine equal squares, representing the former nine counties (județe) of Greater Romania (71 in total) which it included. The four of the squares forming the arms of the cross are of argent; all other squares are gules. The four argent squares bear a sable aurochs head (the symbol of Moldavia - see Flag and coat of arms of Moldavia).

Former counties incorporated
After the 1938 Administrative and Constitutional Reform, the older 71 counties lost their authority. 
 Bacău County
 Bălți County
 Baia County
 Botoșani County
 Iași County
 Neamț County
 Roman County
 Soroca County
 Vaslui County

See also
 Historical administrative divisions of Romania
 Nord-Est (development region)
 History of Romania
 History of Moldova

External links
 Map

Moldavia
Prut
Prut
1938 establishments in Romania
1940 disestablishments in Romania
States and territories established in 1938
States and territories disestablished in 1940